David Ferrer defeated Jerzy Janowicz in the final, 6–4, 6–3 to win the singles tennis title at the 2012 Paris Masters. It was his first Masters 1000 title, and he became the first Spaniard to win the Paris Masters.

Roger Federer was the defending champion, but did not participate due to fatigue. As a result, Novak Djokovic returned to ATP singles world No. 1 at the conclusion of the tournament despite losing at the second round.

Seeds
All seeds receive a bye into the second round.

Draw

Finals

Top half

Section 1

Section 2

Bottom half

Section 3

Section 4

Qualifying

Seeds

Qualifiers

Lucky losers

  Victor Hănescu
  Daniel Gimeno Traver

Draw

First qualifier

Second qualifier

Third qualifier

Fourth qualifier

Fifth qualifier

Sixth qualifier

References
General
 Main Draw
 Qualifying Draw
Specific

2012 ATP World Tour
Singles